Wanted Dread & Alive is the fifth studio album by the Jamaican reggae musician Peter Tosh. It was released in 1981 in two different versions, one for Jamaica and the USA (EMI America) and one for Europe (Rolling Stones Records). It was reissued by Capitol in 2002, with bonus tracks. The lead single was the duet with the American singer Gwen Guthrie, "Nothing But Love".

The album peaked at No. 91 on the Billboard 200.

Critical reception
The New York Times deemed the album "a mixed bag of political sloganeering, Rastafarian cant and reggae-pop". The Globe and Mail thought that "the title cut maintains the outlaw pose with music that easily makes the grade, but lyrics that betray Tosh's penchant for recycling old imagery".

The New Rolling Stone Record Guide wrote that it contains "some of the best Sly and Robbie playing ever".

Track listing
All tracks composed by Peter Tosh except where indicated.

EMI America and Jamaica (SO-17055)
Side 1
"Coming in Hot"
"Nothing But Love" (Ella Mitchell, Freddie Harris)
"Reggae-Mylitis"
"The Poor Man Feel It"
"Cold Blood"
Side 2
"Wanted Dread & Alive"
"Rastafari Is"
"That's What They Will Do"
"Fools Die"

Rolling Stones Records (1A 062-64378)
Side 1
"Coming in Hot"
"Nothing But Love" (Ella Mitchell, Freddie Harris)
"Reggaemylitis"
"Rok With Me" (Jean Watt)
"Oh Bumbo Klaat"
Side 2
"Wanted Dread and Alive"
"Rastafari Is"
"Guide Me from My Friends"
"Fools Die"

Capitol 2002 reissue (37693)
"Coming in Hot"
"Nothing But Love"
"Reggaemylitis"
"Rok With Me"
"Oh Bumbo Klaat"
"Wanted Dread and Alive"
"Rastafari Is"
"Guide Me from My Friends"
"Fools Die (For Want of Wisdom)"
"The Poor Man Feel It"
"Cold Blood"
"That's What They Will Do"
"Rok With Me" (Alternative Long Mix)
"Nothing But Love" (Long Version)
"In a milan"

Personnel
Peter Tosh - lead vocals, backing vocals, guitar, keyboards, percussion 
The Tamlins - backing vocals
Robbie Shakespeare - bass guitar
Sly Dunbar - drums
Pee Wee Walters - flute
Darryl Thompson - lead guitar 
Mikey Chung - rhythm guitar  
Keith Sterling, Robbie Lyn - keyboards
Gwen Guthrie - lead vocals on "Nothing But Love"  
Noel "Scully" Simms, Uziah Thompson - percussion
Dean Fraser - tenor and alto saxophone 
Ronald "Nambo" Robinson - trombone
Barry Rogers, Jon Faddis, Lew Soloff, Lou Marini - horns on "Nothing But Love" 
Technical
Geoffrey Chung - recording, mixing

References

Peter Tosh albums
1981 albums
Rolling Stones Records albums